Gonnelli is an Italian surname. Notable people with the surname include:

Giovanni Gonnelli (1603–1664), Italian sculptor
Lorenzo Gonnelli (born 1993), Italian footballer 
Tullio Gonnelli (1912–2005), Italian athlete 

Italian-language surnames